The following is a list of episodes of the TNT medical drama Hawthorne. The series stars Jada Pinkett Smith as Christina Hawthorne, Chief Nursing Officer, and Michael Vartan as Tom Wakefield, Chief of Surgery at Richmond Trinity Hospital in Richmond, Virginia. In season 2, a new star came on the scene, Marc Anthony as Detective Nick Renata, and the cast moved from Richmond Trinity Hospital to James River Hospital, also in Richmond, Virginia.  Hawthorne premiered on June 16, 2009.

A total of 30 episodes of Hawthorne were produced over three seasons, between June 16, 2009 and August 16, 2011.

Series overview

Episodes

Season 1 (2009)

Season 2 (2010)

Season 3 (2011)

References

External links
 Official website

Lists of American drama television series episodes